Allie Beth Stuckey (born February 18, 1992) is an American conservative commentator whose podcast Relatable with Allie Beth Stuckey is owned and distributed by Blaze Media. She has been a regular guest on Fox News. In November 2019, Stuckey testified before Congress in support of the Trump administration's anti-abortion policies.

Career
Stuckey worked as a publicist and social media strategist in Athens, Georgia. While working as a publicist in Georgia, she began speaking to college students about the importance of voting and, in 2016, started a blog on a Facebook page called The Conservative Millennial. In 2017, she joined TheBlaze as a contributor and began appearing as a guest on Fox News and Fox Business News while continuing to speak on college campuses, to Republican organizations, and to businesses about the importance of engaging young people. In late 2017, she left The Blaze to start a podcast distributed by Conservative Review TV (CRTV).

Stuckey launched her podcast Relatable in March 2018 with CRTV. In 2019, CRTV and TheBlaze merged to become BlazeTV, which now distributes Relatable.

In July 2018, Stuckey released a video on her CRTV Facebook page that depicted a satirical interview with Alexandria Ocasio-Cortez in which the politician appeared to give bizarre answers to the questions she was asked by Stuckey. The video used edited footage from an interview Ocasio-Cortez had previously done on the PBS show Firing Line, and spliced Ocasio-Cortez's answers as responses to Stuckey's questions. The video went viral, with many people labeling the video as a hoax. On her Twitter page, Stuckey responded to the backlash by writing, "If you have to do research to figure out that a video that blatantly absurd is satirical, you shouldn’t be on the Internet." Stuckey said that she was surprised by the response to the video, and that "A lot of people on the left just can’t tolerate someone on the right making a joke, because the only humor now that is protected is humor that is against conservatives or against President Trump."

In September 2019, Stuckey spoke at Congressman Dan Crenshaw's inaugural Youth Summit in Houston.

On November 14, 2019, Stuckey testified as an expert witness before the House of Representatives in a hearing called "Examining State Efforts to Undermine Access to Reproductive Care" held by the House Committee on Oversight and Reform on the issue of abortion in Missouri. Stuckey was the sole witness to testify for the Republicans.

Stuckey hosts a podcast titled Relatable with Allie Beth Stuckey.

In 2020, Stuckey's first book, You're Not Enough (And That's Okay): Escaping the Toxic Culture of Self-Love, a "framework for escaping our culture of trendy narcissism", was published by Penguin Books under .

Personal life
Stuckey is a Christian. She married Timothy Stuckey in Athens, Georgia, on September 6, 2015, and they have two children.

References

External links

Relatable with Allie Beth Stuckey

Living people
1992 births
21st-century American women
American Christians
American political commentators
American social commentators
American women podcasters
American podcasters
Blaze Media people
Commentary YouTubers
American YouTubers
YouTube channels launched in 2016
Texas Republicans
YouTubers from Texas
YouTube podcasters
People from Dallas